You and You Alone may refer to:

You and You Alone (album), by Randy Travis
"You and You Alone" (song), by Vince Gill